Mikheyev may refer to:

 Mikheyev v. Russia, a 2006 European Court of Human Rights case about the state torture of Alexey Mikheyev 
 Aleksandr Mikheyev (born 1961), Russian engineer and business executive 
Aleksei Mikheyev (footballer) (born 1998), Russian footballer
Andrei Mikheyev (born 1987), Russian footballer
Artyom Mikheyev (born 1987), Russian footballer
Evgenу Ivanovich Mikheyev (born 1942), secular name of Eumenius, a Russian Old Believer bishop
Ilya Mikheyev (born 1994), Russian ice hockey player
Mikhail Nikolayevich Mikheyev (1905–1989), Soviet physicist
Oleg Mikheyev, Russian MP and former owner of Volgoprombank
Stanislav Mikheyev (1940–2011), Russian physicist and co-formulator of the Mikheyev–Smirnov–Wolfenstein effect
Viktor Mikheyev (born 1942), Russian coxswain
Vitaliy Mikheyev, Ukrainian strongman
Vladimir Mikheyev (born 1957), Russian swimmer

See also 

 Mikheyev–Smirnov–Wolfenstein effect
 Mikheyevo